WMPV-TV (channel 21) is a religious television station licensed to Mobile, Alabama, United States, serving southwest Alabama and northwest Florida as an owned-and-operated station of the Trinity Broadcasting Network (TBN). The station's studios are located in Mobile, and its transmitter is located near Robertsdale, Alabama.

History

The station was founded in December 1985. WMPV was the only full-powered station in the Mobile–Pensacola viewing area to transmit an analog signal past February 17, 2009, according to a list from the Federal Communications Commission (FCC).

Subchannels

References

External links 
Official website

Trinity Broadcasting Network affiliates
Television channels and stations established in 1985
1985 establishments in Alabama
MPV-TV